Anne Spencer (1882–1975), was an American poet.

Anne Spencer may also refer to:

Anne Spencer, Countess of Sunderland (1683–1716)
Anne Spencer, Countess of Sunderland (died 1715) (  1646–1715)
Anne Spencer (WRNS officer) (1938–2012), Director of the Women's Royal Naval Service

See also
Anne Spencer House, formerly belonged to the poet
Anna Garlin Spencer (1851–1931), American educator, feminist, and Unitarian minister